In 2014, the Campeonato Brasileiro Série D, the fourth division of the Brazilian League, will be contested for the sixth time.
The 2014 Campeonato Brasileiro Série D began on July 27, 2014, and was scheduled to end on November 16, 2014.

Teams 2014

First stage

Group 1 (AC-AP-AM-RO-RR)

Group 2 (CE-MA-PA-PI-TO)

Group 3 (AL-BA-PB-PE-RN)

Group 4 (BA-MG-PE-RN-SE)

Group 5 (DF-ES-GO-MS-MG)

Group 6 (DF-GO-MT-MG-SP)

Group 7 (PR-RJ-RS-SC-SP)

Group 8 (PR-RJ-RS-SC-SP)

Round of 16

|}

Quarterfinals

|}

Semifinals

|}

Finals

|}

References

External links
Soccer way. Regular season

2014
2014 in Brazilian football leagues